Hang Hau East is one of the 29 constituencies in the Sai Kung District.

The constituency returns one district councillor to the Sai Kung District Council, with an election every four years.

Hang Hau East constituency is loosely based on eastern part of Hang Hau with estimated population of 13,902.

Councillors represented

Election results

2010s

References

Hang Hau
Constituencies of Hong Kong
Constituencies of Sai Kung District Council
1999 establishments in Hong Kong
Constituencies established in 1999